Cup of SFR Yugoslavia in Basketball for women took place from in 1960 until 1992, and the most it she won Belgrade Crvena zvezda.

History

Winners

Championship winning teams

See also
 Basketball Federation of Yugoslavia
 Yugoslavia women's national basketball team
 Yugoslav Women's Basketball League

References

External links
 Yugoslav Women's Basketball Cup

Women's basketball competitions in Yugoslavia
Defunct women's basketball cup competitions in Europe
1960 establishments in Yugoslavia
Recurring sporting events established in 1960
1992 disestablishments in Yugoslavia
Recurring sporting events disestablished in 1992